William Clark O'Kelley (January 2, 1930 – July 5, 2017) was a  United States district judge of the United States District Court for the Northern District of Georgia.

Education and career
Born in Atlanta, Georgia, O'Kelley received an Artium Baccalaureus degree from Emory University in 1951 and a Bachelor of Laws from Emory University School of Law in 1953. He was in the United States Air Force from 1953 to 1957, thereafter remaining in the United States Air Force Reserve until 1966. He was in private practice in Atlanta from 1957 to 1959, and was an Assistant United States Attorney of the Northern District of Georgia from 1959 to 1961, returning to private practice in Atlanta until 1970. He was also a special hearing officer for the United States Department of Justice from 1962 to 1968.

Federal judicial service
On October 7, 1970, O'Kelley was nominated by President Richard Nixon to a new seat on the United States District Court for the Northern District of Georgia created by 84 Stat. 294. He was confirmed by the United States Senate on October 13, 1970, and received his commission on October 16, 1970. He was assigned as a judge of the United States Foreign Intelligence Surveillance Court from 1980 to 1987, and was Chief Judge of the Northern District of Georgia from 1988 to 1994. He assumed senior status on October 1, 1996, serving in that status until his death of cancer on July 5, 2017.

References

1930 births
2017 deaths
People from Atlanta
Emory University School of Law alumni
Assistant United States Attorneys
Judges of the United States District Court for the Northern District of Georgia
United States district court judges appointed by Richard Nixon
United States Air Force airmen
20th-century American judges
Deaths from cancer in Georgia (U.S. state)
Judges of the United States Foreign Intelligence Surveillance Court
United States Air Force reservists